Ross Island is the main island of a four-island cluster in the Willamette River in Portland, Oregon, in the United States. The other three islands are Hardtack, East, and Toe. Ross Island was named for Oregon pioneer Sherry Ross.

The islands split the Willamette River into Holgate Slough on the east.
Ross is the longest of the islands, the closest to the western shore, and the closest to the Ross Island Bridge. Hardtack is to its east. East Island lies southeast of Hardtack, and Toe Island lies southwest of Ross. No bridge reaches the islands, which are approached only by boat.

Ross Island is connected to Hardtack Island by an artificial levee built in 1926 by the U.S. Army Corps of Engineers in order to form a lagoon between the two islands. The lagoon made dredging easier for RISG and diverted water west of the islands, where it deepened a shipping channel.

In 2007, the owner of RISG, Robert B. Pamplin, Jr., donated  of the island to the city of Portland, which plans to manage the property as a natural area.
The islands, which retain remnants of forested riparian zones,  are used by at least 50 species of birds including ospreys, eagles, and herons. The gift was accepted long after transfer negotiations stalled in 2002 over questions of liability for the islands' restoration and cleanup.
Because it contains toxic fill dirt, the Ross-Hardtack lagoon is listed for cleanup by the Oregon Department of Environmental Quality.

In addition to the gifted acres and the  still owned by RISG, the Port of Portland owns . Conservationists have expressed hope that the Port will donate its land to the city and that Pamplin and city officials will agree on a long-term plan for the islands.

References

External links
Questions and Answers About the Ross Island Assessment Project from the State of Oregon website
Ross Island Park: A 1912 map shows what could have been part of Portland park system - The Oregonian
Ross Island: History & Present  Video produced by Oregon Field Guide

Geography of Portland, Oregon
Islands of the Willamette River
Landforms of Multnomah County, Oregon
Brooklyn, Portland, Oregon
Uninhabited islands of Oregon